Tekes may refer to:
 Tekes (agency), the Finnish Funding Agency for Technology and Innovation
 Tekes River in Kazakhstan and China, a tributary of the Ili River
 Tekes County in Xinjiang, China, on the eponymous river
 Tekes Town, the county seat of Tekes County

See also
 Tékes, a village in Hungary
 Teke people, a Bantu-speaking ethnic group in Equatorial Africa
 Tekezé River in Ethiopia
 Teke (disambiguation)
 Tex (disambiguation)